"Pilgrims on the Way (Matthew's Song)" is a song recorded by American country music artist Michael Martin Murphey. It was released in September 1988 as the third single from the album River of Time. The song reached No. 29 on the Billboard Hot Country Singles & Tracks chart.  The song was written by Marcus Hummon.

Chart performance

References

1988 singles
1988 songs
Michael Martin Murphey songs
Songs written by Marcus Hummon
Warner Records singles